Saint-Bonaventure is a municipality in the Drummond Regional County Municipality of southwestern Quebec. The population as of the Canada 2011 Census was 1,017. It lies at the eastern terminus of Quebec Route 224, northeast of Saint-Guillaume.

Demographics

Population
Population trend:

Language
Mother tongue language (2006)

See also
 List of municipalities in Quebec
 Municipal reorganization in Quebec

References

Municipalities in Quebec
Incorporated places in Centre-du-Québec